Albert Stock (21 April 1897 – 4 May 1969) was a Welsh international rugby union centre who played club rugby for Newport. While with Newport, Stock faced three international touring teams and scored over a hundred tries for the club.

Rugby career
Born in Newport, Stock was introduced to rugby while serving in Egypt during World War I. After returning to Wales he joined hard, dock team Pill Harriers, before switching to Newport in 1921. In 1924, Stock was selected to play for Wales against France in the Five Nations Championship. Under the captaincy of Rowe Harding, Stock was part of a ramshackle selection, caused by the late suspension of Ossie Male. Wales won, but unconvincingly.

Towards the end of 1924, Stock was part of the Newport team to face the touring New Zealand team. Newport came close to beating the All Blacks, and Stock found himself re-selected for Wales when they played the touring New Zealanders on 29 November.  Wales were thoroughly beaten by the All Blacks, and Stone did not play for any of the 1925 Five Nations Championship. In 1926 Stone was back in the Welsh team and faced England and Scotland in the Championship. The game against Scotland, the very first Welsh match at Murrayfield, was Stock's last for his country.

Away from internationals, Stock continued to represent Newport playing against two more touring sides. He faced the New South Wales Waratahs in 1926 and the New Zealand Māori rugby union team in 1927.

International games played
Wales
  1926
  1924
  1924
  1926

Bibliography

References

1897 births
1969 deaths
Rugby union centres
British Army personnel of World War I
Rugby union players from Newport, Wales
Welsh rugby union players
Wales international rugby union players
Newport RFC players
Pill Harriers RFC players